The 1947 French Championships (now known as the French Open) was a tennis tournament that took place on the outdoor clay courts at the Stade Roland-Garros in Paris, France. The tournament ran from 14 July until 27 July. It was the 51st staging of the French Championships. In 1947 (as in 1946) the French Championships were held after Wimbledon. They were thus, both, the third Grand Slam tennis event of the year and 1947 was the last tournament until the 2020 French Open to be held outside of the usual May–June schedule. József Asbóth and Patricia Todd won the singles titles.

Finals

Seniors

Men's singles

 József Asbóth defeated  Eric Sturgess, 8–6, 7–5, 6–4

Women's singles

 Patricia Todd defeated  Doris Hart, 6–3, 3–6, 6–4

Men's doubles
 Eustace Fannin /  Eric Sturgess defeated  Tom Brown /  Bill Sidwell, 6–4, 4–6, 6–4, 6–3

Women's doubles
 Louise Brough  /  Margaret Osborne defeated  Doris Hart /  Patricia Todd, 7–5, 6–2

Mixed doubles
 Sheila Piercey Summers /  Eric Sturgess defeated  Jadwiga Jędrzejowska  /  Cristea Caralulis, 6–0, 6–0

Juniors

Boys' singles
 Jacques Brichant defeated  Alan Roberts, 6–3, 4–6, 7–5

References

External links
 French Open official website

French Championships
French Championships (tennis) by year
French Champ
French Champ
French Champ